"Mighty Oregon" is the fight song for the University of Oregon. It is played by the Oregon Marching Band at home football and basketball games. Director of Bands, Albert Perfect, along with journalism student DeWitt Gilbert, wrote the fight song, "The Mighty Oregon March", which was first performed on March 4, 1916. For the song's most popular section, Perfect fashioned a new melody to fit into the harmony from "It's a Long Way to Tipperary", a hit 1912 World War I march. The catchy popularity of the harmony was not lost on Perfect, a man well-educated in music theory, who originally subtitled the song "The Tipperary of the West." Over the years there have been several changes to the lyrics and, today, the middle stanza is generally the only one sung and it is done so using more modern lyrics than the original.

The song was first performed on January 7, 1916 at the Eugene Municipal Band's inaugural performance and is today played during all home football and basketball games as well as from speakers atop the Erb Memorial Union (the school's student union) weekdays at noon and 6 p.m. In addition, it is played from atop the EMU on Commencement Day.

"Mighty Oregon" is also the fight song of Canyon View High School, North Canyon High School, Okeechobee High School, and Cleveland High School

"Mighty Oregon" was also the fight song of Elkhart Memorial High School, which closed when it merged with Elkhart Central High School, and was the fight song for Frankfurt American High School which closed in 1995 when US forces left Frankfurt, Germany.

See also

 O (gesture)

References

University of Oregon
American college songs
Pac-12 Conference fight songs
1916 establishments in Oregon
1916 songs
Songs about Oregon